Armand Séguin (1869–1903) was a post-Impressionist French painter who is remembered for his involvement in the Pont-Aven School beginning in 1891. In 1892, he returned to Pont-Aven where he met Renoir and Émile Bernard. The following year, he associated with Paul Gauguin, who gave him lessons, and collaborated with Roderic O'Conor in producing etchings.

He died in Châteauneuf-du-Faou at the age of 34, a destitute alcoholic who was suffering from tuberculosis.

He was a grandson of chemist Armand Séguin.

References

19th-century French painters
French male painters
20th-century French painters
20th-century French male artists
1869 births
1903 deaths
Pont-Aven painters
19th-century French male artists